John Mason Good (25 May 1764 – 2 January 1827), English writer on medical, religious and classical subjects, was born at Epping, Essex.

John Good's parents were the Nonconformist minister Revd Peter Good and Sarah Good, the daughter of another Nonconformist minister, Revd Henry Peyto of Great Coggeshall. John Mason Good was named after the Puritan clergyman and hymn writer John Mason (1645-1694), of whom his mother Sarah was a descendant.

Good attended a school at Romsey kept by his father. At about the age of 15 John Good was apprenticed to a surgeon-apothecary at Gosport. In 1783 he went to London to practice his medical studies.  In the autumn of 1784, he began to practice as a surgeon at Sudbury in Suffolk. There he was an acquaintance of Nathan Drake, a fellow writer and student of Shakespeare.

In 1793 Good removed to London, where he entered into partnership with a surgeon and apothecary. But the partnership was soon dissolved, and to increase his income, he began to devote attention to literary pursuits. Besides contributing both in prose and verse to the Analytical and Critical Reviews and the British and Monthly Magazines, and other periodicals, he wrote a large number of works relating chiefly to medical and religious subjects.

In 1794 John Good became a member of the British Pharmaceutical Society, and in that connection, and especially by the publication of his work, A History of Medicine (1795), he did much to effect a greatly needed reform in the profession of the apothecary. In 1795 the London Medical Society awarded him their Fothergillian gold medal.  In 1820, he took the diploma of M.D. at Marischal College, University of Aberdeen. He died at Shepperton, Middlesex, on 2 January 1827.

Good was not only well versed in classical literature, but was acquainted with the principal European languages, and also with Persian, Arabic and Hebrew. His prose works display wide erudition, but their style is dull and tedious.  His poetry never rises above pleasant and well-versified commonplace.  His translation of Lucretius, The Nature of Things (1805-1807), contains elaborate philological and explanatory notes, together with parallel passages and quotations from European and Asiatic authors.

See also 
John Mason Neale, namesake

References

 
 Olinthus Gregory, Charles Jerram, Memoirs of the Life, Writings, and Character, Literary, Professional, and Religious of the late John Mason Good MD, Crocker and Brewster, Boston, Mass. (1829).

1764 births
1827 deaths
English writers
People from Epping
Alumni of the University of Aberdeen
Fellows of the Royal Society
English male writers